The Little Rubicon River, an inland perennial river of the Goulburn Broken catchment, part of the Murray-Darling basin, is located in the lower South Eastern Highlands bioregion and Northern Country/North Central regions of the Australian state of Victoria. The headwaters of the Little Rubicon River rise on the western slopes of the Victorian Alps and descend to flow into the Rubicon River.

Location and features

See also

References

Goulburn Broken catchment
Rivers of Hume (region)
Tributaries of the Goulburn River
Victorian Alps